Mikhail Fyodorovich Vladimirsky (– 2 April 1951) was a Soviet politician and Bolshevik revolutionary who was for a short period of time, the Chairman of the All-Russian Central Executive Committee.

Biography 
Mikhail Vladimirsky was born in 1874, as the son of Orthodox priest and Duma-member Fyodor Vladimirsky.

He became involved with the revolutionary movement and Marxism in the early 1890s in Nizhny Novgorod Marxist circles. From 1895, as a student at the Imperial Moscow University, he began to work as a propagandist and organizer of workers' circles. At the end of 1895 united around a Marxist circle led by, Vladimirsky, they renamed Workers' Union to the Moscow Workers' Union.

In 1896, for his participation in the creation of the Moscow Workers' Union he was arrested and exiled to his home city. In 1898-1899 he was a member of the Moscow Committee of the Russian Social Democratic Labour Party. In the spring of 1899, during the student unrest, he was once again expelled from Moscow, and then left for Switzerland, where he continued his medical education. Vladimirsky joined Plekhanov's Emancipation of Labor group and collaborated in the foreign organization Iskra. After the 2nd Congress of the RSDLP (1903) he became a Bolshevik. 

He was in office as acting Chairman of the Central Executive Committee of the All-Russian Congress of Soviets from 16 March 1919 to 30 March 1919 after the death of Yakov Sverdlov. He was also Deputy of Chairman of Gosplan (the State Committee for Planning) of the USSR from 1926 to 1927 and People's Commissar of Public Healthcare of the RSFSR from 1930 to 1934. In those turbulent years, he was a supporter of Stalin's line against deviations by Leon Trotsky and Nikolai Bukharin.

In 1927, Vladimirsky became chairman of the Central Auditing Commission of the Communist Party, a position he kept until his death. At time of his death, he was also a deputy of the Supreme Soviet. 

He died on 2 April, 1951 at Moscow aged 77, and was given a state funeral and his ashes were at Kremlin Wall Necropolis.

References

 Biography 

1874 births
1951 deaths
People from Arzamas
People from Arzamassky Uyezd
Russian Social Democratic Labour Party members
Old Bolsheviks
Central Committee of the Communist Party of the Soviet Union members
Heads of state of the Russian Soviet Federative Socialist Republic
Soviet Ministers of Health
Third convocation members of the Supreme Soviet of the Soviet Union
Tomsk State University alumni
Humboldt University of Berlin alumni
Recipients of the Order of Lenin
Burials at the Kremlin Wall Necropolis